The 2021 Pittsburgh mayoral election took place on November 2, 2021. The primary election was held on May 18, 2021. The Democratic nominee, State Representative Ed Gainey, defeated the Republican nominee, retired police officer Tony Moreno.

Incumbent Democratic Mayor Bill Peduto ran for re-election to a third term in office, but lost renomination to state representative Ed Gainey. Four Democrats and no Republicans filed to appear on their respective primary ballots. Tony Moreno, though having unsuccessfully sought the Democratic nomination, was the Republican nominee after having earned sufficient votes in the Republican primary as a write-in candidate to win the nomination. Two independent candidates had originally indicated an intention to file to appear on the general election ballot, though one withdrew and the other was removed from the ballot by judicial order. With 70,885 ballots cast, this was the highest turnout for a Pittsburgh mayoral race since 1997.

Background
Bill Peduto was first elected in the 2013 election to succeed Luke Ravenstahl and assumed office in January 2014. Peduto sought and was re-elected to a second term in the 2017 election; in November 2017, Peduto garnered 96% of the vote, having not had any significant opposition in the general election.

Democratic primary
The Democratic primary election was held on May 18, 2021. As of January 2021, four candidates had indicated an intention to seek the Democratic nomination. Retired Pittsburgh Police officer Tony Moreno announced his intention in September 2019, William Peduto announced his campaign for a third term in mid—January 2021, and State Representative Ed Gainey launched his campaign in late January 2021. Activist Will Parker launched his campaign in mid-December 2020. In March, four Democrats had filed paperwork to appear on the ballot, Peduto, Gainey, Moreno, and college math tutor and ride-sharing driver Michael Thompson. Parker did not file nominating papers.

In mid-February 2021, Pittsburgh City Paper reported candidate Tony Moreno's Twitter included tweets praising Donald Trump, were supportive of Trump causes, and contained contempt for Democrats. After Pittsburgh City Paper's report was published Moreno's tweets were criticised by Pittsburgh's Democratic Committee chairman, many tweets were deleted from Moreno's Twitter, and his Twitter was switched to protected status.

In early March 2021, the Allegheny County Democratic Committee announced that it had endorsed Gainey over the incumbent mayor Peduto, with 326 votes. Moreno received 224 votes. Peduto did not actively seek the endorsement of the committee, citing its endorsement of a Democratic candidate for the Pennsylvania House of Representatives who had made social media posts supportive of then-President Donald Trump. Peduto received the endorsements of some other Democratic leaders, including County Executive Rich Fitzgerald, U.S. Representative Mike Doyle, and State Senate minority leader Jay Costa.

Candidates

Nominee
Ed Gainey, Pennsylvania State Representative from the 24th District

Defeated in primary
Bill Peduto, incumbent Mayor of Pittsburgh
Tony Moreno, retired Pittsburgh Police officer
Michael Thompson, college math tutor and ride-sharing driver

Failed to qualify
Will Parker, businessman and activist (running as an independent)

Endorsements

Results

Bill Peduto conceded the Democratic primary election to Ed Gainey on the night of the election.

Republican primary
No Republican filed to run.

Results

Aftermath
Under Pennsylvania law, a candidate can win a party's nomination via write-in votes if they surpass 250 votes in said party's primary, even if they are not a member of that party. This means that Moreno and Peduto both qualified to appear on the November ballot as the Republican nominee. Peduto stated he had no intention of continuing his campaign and endorsed Ed Gainey. Moreno announced that he would accept the Republican nomination in late June and switched his party registration to Republican.

Accepted nomination
Tony Moreno, retired police officer

Declined
Bill Peduto, incumbent mayor (Democratic)

Independents

Failed to qualify
Will Parker (ran as a write-in)

Withdrawn 
Marlin Woods, businessman, public speaker, author, mentor

General election

Results

References

External links
Official campaign websites
 Edward Gainey (D) for Mayor
 Tony Moreno (R) for Mayor 
 Will Parker (I) for Mayor
 Marlin Woods (I) for Mayor
 Bill Peduto (D) for Mayor
 Michael Thompson (D) for Mayor 

2021
Pittsburgh
November 2021 events in the United States
2021 Pennsylvania elections
2020s in Pittsburgh